Anzor Ratmirovich Dzamikhov (born 3 April 1975) is a Russian professional football coach and former player.

Club career
He made his professional debut in the Russian Second Division in 1993 for FC Avtozapchast Baksan.

References

1975 births
Sportspeople from Nalchik
Living people
Russian footballers
Association football midfielders
PFC Spartak Nalchik players
FC Spartak Vladikavkaz players
FC Lokomotiv Nizhny Novgorod players
FC Saturn Ramenskoye players
FC Elista players
FC Volgar Astrakhan players
Russian Premier League players
Russian football managers